The Modern South Arabian languages (MSALs), also known as Eastern South Semitic languages, are a group of endangered languages spoken by small populations inhabiting the Arabian Peninsula, in Yemen and Oman, and Socotra Island. Together with the modern Ethiopian Semitic languages, the Western branch, they form the South Semitic sub-branch of the Afroasiatic language family's Semitic branch.

Classification 
In his glottochronology-based classification, Alexander Militarev presents the Modern South Arabian languages as a South Semitic branch opposed to a North Semitic branch that includes all the other Semitic languages. They are no longer considered to be descendants of the Old South Arabian language, as was once thought, but instead "nephews". Despite the name, they are not closely related to the Arabic language.

Languages 
 Mehri: the largest Modern South Arabian language, with over 165,000 speakers. Most Mehri speakers, around 76,000, live in Oman, but around 50,000 live in Yemen, and around 40,000 speakers live as guest workers in Kuwait and Saudi Arabia. Mehri people are referred to as Mahra.
 Soqotri: another relatively numerous example, with speakers on the island of Socotra isolated from the pressures of Arabic on the Yemeni mainland. In 2015, there were around 70,000 speakers.
 Shehri: frequently called Jibbali, "of the Mountains", with an estimated 25,000 speakers; it is best known as the language of the rebels during the Dhofar Rebellion in Oman's Dhofar Governorate along the border with Yemen in the 1960s and 1970s.
 Bathari: Under 100 speakers in Oman. Located on the southeast coast facing the Khuriya Muriya Islands. Very similar to Mehri, and some tribespeople speak Mehri instead of Bathari.
 Harsusi: 600 speakers in the Jiddat al-Harasis of Oman.
 Hobyót: 100 speakers est., in Oman and Yemen.

Grammar 
Modern South Arabian languages are known for their apparent archaic Semitic features, especially in their system of phonology. For example, they preserve the lateral fricatives of Proto-Semitic.

Additionally, Militarev identified a Cushitic substratum in Modern South Arabian, which he proposes is evidence that Cushitic speakers originally inhabited the Arabian Peninsula alongside Semitic speakers (Militarev 1984, 18-19; cf. also Belova 2003). According to Václav Blažek, this suggests that Semitic peoples assimilated their original Cushitic neighbours to the south who did not later emigrate to the Horn of Africa. He argues that the Levant would thus have been the Proto-Afro-Asiatic Urheimat, from where the various branches of the Afro-Asiatic family subsequently dispersed. To further support this, Blažek cites analysis of rock art in Central Arabia by Anati (1968, 180-84), which notes a connection between the shield-carrying "oval-headed" people depicted on the cave paintings and the Arabian Cushites from the Old Testament, who were similarly described as carrying specific shields.

Reconstruction 
Proto-Modern South Arabian reconstructions by Roger Blench (2019):

References

Bibliography

External links 
 The Modern South Arabian Languages , by M.C.Simeone-Senelle

 
South Semitic languages
Languages of Oman
Languages of Yemen
South Arabia